A number of steamships were named Westport, including –

, an American passenger ship in service 1911–18 and from 1919
, an American cargo ship in service 1919–41
, an American tanker in service 1948–54

Ship names